Doon Valley  is one of the nine electoral wards of East Ayrshire Council. Created in 2007, the ward elects three councillors using the single transferable vote electoral system and covers an area with a population of 11,592 people.

The area was previously a Labour stronghold with the party holding two of the three seats between 2009 and 2017. However, the ward has since been split between Labour and the Scottish National Party (SNP).

Boundaries
The ward was created following the Fourth Statutory Reviews of Electoral Arrangements ahead of the 2007 Scottish local elections. As a result of the Local Governance (Scotland) Act 2004, local elections in Scotland would use the single transferable vote electoral system from 2007 onwards so Doon Valley was formed from an amalgamation of several previous first-past-the-post wards. It contained all of the former Patna and Dalrymple ward as well as part of the former Drongan, Stair and Rankinston, Dalmellington and Ochiltree, Skares, Netherthird and Craigens wards. Doon Valley includes the southernmost part of the council area between its borders with South Ayrshire and Dumfries and Galloway and takes in the towns of Dalmellington, Patna and Drongan. The River Doon runs north-south through the ward and into Loch Doon which lies in the south of the ward. Following the Fifth Statutory Reviews of Electoral Arrangements ahead of the 2017 Scottish local elections, the ward's boundaries were not changed.

Councillors

Election results

2022 election

2017 election

2012 election

2009 by-election

2007 election

References

Wards of East Ayrshire
Dalmellington